Franklin-Penland House, also known as Theodore C. Franklin House, Stokes Penland House, and Linville Falls Post Office, is a historic home located at Linville Falls, Burke County, North Carolina.  It was built about 1883, and is a two-story, three-bay, frame I-house with a two-story rear ell.  It features a full-width, attached two-tiered shed roof porch added about 1915.  Also on the property is the former U.S. Post Office, Linville Falls, N.C., building.  The one-room front gable frame building was built in 1907 and housed the Linville Falls post office until 1925.

It was listed on the National Register of Historic Places in 2006.

References

Houses on the National Register of Historic Places in North Carolina
Houses completed in 1883
Houses in Burke County, North Carolina
National Register of Historic Places in Burke County, North Carolina